Natalia Aleksandrovna Lavrova (4 August 1984 – 23 April 2010) was a dual Olympic gold medalist. Lavrova was the first group rhythmic gymnast to win two gold medals in the rhythmic gymnastics group event at the 2000 and 2004 Summer Olympics.

Life and career 
Lavrova was born in Penza, Soviet Union. Her first coach was Olga Stebeneva at the Dinamo club in Penza.

Lavrova died in a car accident in Penza Oblast in 2010. She was a passenger in a car driven by her pregnant sister Olga Popova (Ольга Попова) who also died in the collision with another vehicle near Penza, some 600 kilometers south-east of Moscow. The car (VAZ 2114) was completely destroyed by fire after the accident. The driver of the other car was injured.

Detailed Olympic results

References

External links

Pictures of the accident

1984 births
2010 deaths
Sportspeople from Penza
Penza State University alumni
Russian rhythmic gymnasts
Olympic gymnasts of Russia
Olympic gold medalists for Russia
Gymnasts at the 2000 Summer Olympics
Gymnasts at the 2004 Summer Olympics
Road incident deaths in Russia
Olympic medalists in gymnastics
Medalists at the 2004 Summer Olympics
Medalists at the 2000 Summer Olympics
Medalists at the Rhythmic Gymnastics World Championships
Medalists at the Rhythmic Gymnastics European Championships